The Islamic Azad University, Shahinshahr Branch (IAUSHSH), also known as Azad University of Shahinshahr, is a campus of Islamic Azad University system in Iran.

Academic campus

Founded in 2004, the campus is located in Shahinshahr, Isfahan Province, in the pleasant touristic province of Isfahan.

Education

At present, Islamic Azad University of Shahinshahr is offering 11 degree programs including:
1 - Architectural Engineering Technology, 2 - Animal Production Engineering, 3 - Civil Technology Engineering, 4 - Engineering Manufacturing Technology, 5 Architectural Drawing, 6 - Drawing Technology (General), 7 - Graphics, 8 - Computers-Software, 9 - Automotive mechanic, 10 - facilities-Air conditioning, 11 - Veterinary

See also
 List of Universities in Isfahan Province

References
 Islamic Azad University of Shahinshahr

External links
 Islamic Azad University of Shahinshahr
 Islamic Azad University of Shahinshahr_Main Entrance 1
 Islamic Azad University of Shahinshahr_Main Entrance 2
 Islamic Azad University of Shahinshahr_3

Shahinshahr, Islamic Azad University of
Buildings and structures in Isfahan Province
Education in Isfahan Province